Hi! Honey (Traditional Chinese: 嗨！親愛的) is a Taiwanese television drama series that aired on CTV in 2004. The series ran for a total of 21 episodes, and starred Pace Wu, Shi Yinan and Harisu. Harisu's lines were spoken in her native Korean and later dubbed into Mandarin.

Cast list 
Pace Wu — Xu Tianzhen
Shi Yinan — Shu Li
Harisu — Lu Jialing
Margaret Lin Liwen — Xu Tianqing
Eddie Xu Junhao — Guan Shang'en
Gao Congkai — Gao Chenwei
Chen Baiyu — Xiao Man
Fu Lei — Shu Hanji
Sun Xing — Xu Shude
Liu Yukai — Xiao Ye
Li Chenxi — Zhi Zhi
Xu Jiehui — Cheng Jie

International Broadcast

References

External links 
Official site
Hi! Honey sy

2004 Taiwanese television series debuts
2004 Taiwanese television series endings
Taiwanese drama television series
Television shows set in Taiwan